William Bryson may refer to:

 William Bryson (civil engineer) (1823–1903), Scottish civil engineer, surveyor and architect 
 William Bryson (electrical engineer) (1855–1906), Scottish electrical and marine engineer
 William Curtis Bryson (born 1945), American judge
 Bill Bryson (politician) (1898–1973), Australian Labor Party politician
 Bill Bryson (born 1951), American author
 Bill Bryson Sr. (1915–1986), American journalist